Pandegaon is a village in Belgaum district of Karnataka, India. Situated at the bank of Agrani river.

Pandegaon was the part of Bombay state (Now Maharashtra) up to 1960. After separating the Bombay State into Maharashtra, Gujarat and adding up Kannada speaking states to Mysore State, now Karnataka. Nearest railway Stations Agran Dhulgaon 5 km, Kavathe-Mahankal 8 km. Nearest Railway Junction Miraj 40 km . Nearest airport Kolhapur 90 km, Belgaum 150 km.

Pandegaon comes under Kagwad Vidhana Sabha constituency Chikkodi Lok Sabha Constituency. Also farming is the main business of the people. Major people in the town are in Indian Military.

Pandegaon Census Details (2011)

References

Villages in Belagavi district